The Earth House is a 1993 non-fiction memoir by American author Jeanne DuPrau.

Plot summary
They hadn't pictured themselves as the sort of people to take up Eastern spiritual practice, but on their first visit to a zen center, two women discover something that speaks to them on a level deeper than their everyday experience, and they begin to make a new plan for their lives. They begin to consider giving up their suburban comforts and build a house beside a monastery in the mountains. As the walls of the house go up, the two women make and re-make plans, wrestle with a chainsaw, learn to make windows, and set up a computer powered by the sun. Their spiritual practice transforms their vision of the house, and the building of it transforms them both.

1993 American memoirs
Adult non-fiction books